Ido is a constructed language derived from Reformed Esperanto, and similarly designed with the goal of being a universal second language for people of diverse backgrounds. To function as an effective international auxiliary language, Ido was specifically designed to be grammatically, orthographically, and lexicographically regular (and, above all, easy to learn and use). It is the most successful of the many Esperanto derivatives, called Esperantidoj.

Ido was created in 1907 out of a desire to reform perceived flaws in Esperanto, a language that had been created 20 years earlier to facilitate international communication. The name of the language traces its origin to the Esperanto word , meaning "offspring", since the language is a "descendant" of Esperanto. After its inception, Ido gained support from some in the Esperanto community. A setback occurred with the sudden death in 1914 of one of its most influential proponents, Louis Couturat. In 1928, leader Otto Jespersen left the movement for his own language Novial. There were two reasons for why  Ido declined in popularity: first, the emergence of further schisms arising from competing reform projects; and second, a general lack of awareness of Ido as a candidate for an international language. These obstacles weakened the movement and it was not until the rise of the Internet that it began to regain momentum.

Ido uses the same 26 letters as the English (Latin) alphabet, with no diacritics. It draws its vocabulary from English, French, German, Italian, Latin, Russian, Spanish and Portuguese, and is largely intelligible to those who have studied Esperanto.

Several works of literature have been translated into Ido, including The Little Prince, the Book of Psalms, and the Gospel of Luke. As of the year 2000, there were approximately 100–200 Ido speakers in the world. In 2020, Ido had 24 native speakers in Finland.

History
The idea of a universal second language is not new, and constructed languages are not a recent phenomenon. The first known constructed language was Hildegard of Bingen's Lingua Ignota, created in the 12th century. The concept did not attract significant interest until the language Volapük was created in 1879. Volapük was popular for some time and apparently had a few thousand users, but was later eclipsed by the popularity of Esperanto, which arose in 1887. Several other languages, such as Latino sine Flexione and Idiom Neutral were also put forward. It was during this time that French mathematician Louis Couturat formed the Delegation for the Adoption of an International Auxiliary Language.

This delegation made a formal request to the International Association of Academies in Vienna to select and endorse an international language; the request was rejected in May 1907. The Delegation then met as a Committee in Paris in October 1907 to discuss the adoption of a standard international language. Among the languages considered was a new language anonymously submitted at the last moment (and therefore against the Committee rules) under the pen name Ido. In the end the committee, always without plenary sessions and consisting of only 12 members, concluded the last day with 4 votes for and 1 abstention. They concluded that no language was completely acceptable, but that Esperanto could be accepted "on condition of several modifications to be realized by the permanent Commission in the direction defined by the conclusions of the Report of the Secretaries [Louis Couturat and Léopold Leau] and by the Ido project".

Esperanto's inventor, L. L. Zamenhof, having heard a number of complaints, had suggested in 1894 a proposal for a Reformed Esperanto with several changes that Ido adopted and made it closer to French: eliminating the accented letters and the accusative case, changing the plural to an Italianesque -i, and replacing the table of correlatives with more Latinate words. However, the Esperanto community voted and rejected Reformed Esperanto, and likewise most rejected the recommendations of the 1907 Committee composed by 12 members. Zamenhof deferred to their judgment, although doubtful. Furthermore, controversy ensued when the "Ido project" was found to have been primarily devised by Louis de Beaufront, whom  Zamenhof had chosen to represent Esperanto before the committee, as the committee's rules dictated that the creator of a submitted language could not defend it. The committee's language was French and not everyone could speak in French. When the president of the Committee asked who was the author of Ido's project, Couturat, Beaufront and Leau answered that they were not. Beaufront was the person who presented Ido's project and gave a description as a better, richer version of Esperanto. Couturat, Leau, Beaufront and Jespersen were finally the only members who voted, all of them for Ido's project. A month later, Couturat accidentally put Jespersen in a copy of a letter in which he acknowledged that Beaufront was the author of the Ido project. Jespersen was angered by this and asked for a public confession, which was never forthcoming.

It is estimated that some 20% of Esperanto leaders and 3–4% of ordinary Esperantists switched to Ido, which from then on suffered constant modifications seeking to perfect it, but which ultimately had the effect of causing many Ido speakers to give up on trying to learn it. Although it fractured the Esperanto movement, the schism gave the remaining Esperantists the freedom to concentrate on using and promoting their language as it stood. At the same time, it gave the Idists freedom to continue working on their own language for several more years before actively promoting it. The Uniono di la Amiki di la Linguo Internaciona (Union of Friends of the International Language) was established along with an Ido Academy to work out the details of the new language.

Couturat, who was the leading proponent of Ido, was killed in an automobile accident in 1914. This, along with World War I, practically suspended the activities of the Ido Academy from 1914 to 1920. In 1928 Ido's major intellectual supporter, the Danish linguist Otto Jespersen, published his own planned language, Novial. His leaving the Ido movement set it back even further.

Digital era
The language still has active speakers, numbering about 500. The Internet has sparked a renewal of interest in the language in recent years. A sample of 24 Idists on the Yahoo! group Idolisto during November 2005 showed that 57% had begun their studies of the language during the preceding three years, 32% from the mid-1990s to 2002, and 8% had known the language from before.

Changes
Few changes have been made to Ido since 1922.

Camiel de Cock was named secretary of linguistic issues in 1990, succeeding Roger Moureaux. He resigned after the creation of a linguistic committee in 1991. De Cock was succeeded by Robert C. Carnaghan, who held the position from 1992 to 2008. No new words were adopted between 2001 and 2006. Following the 2008–2011 elections of ULI's direction committee, Gonçalo Neves replaced Carnaghan as secretary of linguistic issues in February 2008. Neves resigned in August 2008. A new linguistic committee was formed in 2010.  In April 2010, Tiberio Madonna was appointed as secretary of linguistic issues, succeeding Neves.  
In January 2011, ULI approved eight new words. This was the first addition of words in many years. As of January 2021, the secretary of linguistic issues remains Tiberio Madonna.

Phonology
Ido has five vowel phonemes. The orthographic sequences  and  indicate diphthongs in word roots but not when created by affixing.

All polysyllabic words are stressed on the second-to-last syllable except for verb infinitives, which are stressed on the last syllableskolo, kafeo and lernas for "school", "coffee" and the present tense of "to learn", but irar, savar and drinkar for "to go", "to know" and "to drink". If an i or u precedes another vowel, the pair is considered part of the same syllable when applying the accent rulethus radio, familio and manuo for "radio", "family" and "hand", unless the two vowels are the only ones in the word, in which case the "i" or "u" is stressed: dio, frua for "day" and "early".

Orthography
Ido uses the same 26 letters as the English alphabet and ISO Basic Latin alphabet with three digraphs and no ligatures or diacritics. Where the table below lists two pronunciations, either is perfectly acceptable.

The digraphs are:

Grammar
The definite article is "la" and is invariable.  The indefinite article (a/an) does not exist in Ido. Each word in the Ido vocabulary is built from a root word. A word consists of a root and a grammatical ending. Other words can be formed from that word by removing the grammatical ending and adding a new one, or by inserting certain affixes between the root and the grammatical ending.

Some of the grammatical endings are defined as follows:

These are the same as in Esperanto except for -i, -ir, -ar, -or and -ez. Esperanto marks noun plurals by an agglutinative ending -j (so plural nouns end in -oj), uses -i for verb infinitives (Esperanto infinitives are tenseless), and uses -u for the imperative. Verbs in Ido, as in Esperanto, do not conjugate depending on person, number or gender; the -as, -is, and -os endings suffice whether the subject is I, you, he, she, they, or anything else. For the word "to be," Ido allows either "esas" or "es" in the present tense; however, the full forms must be used for the past tense "esis" and future tense "esos."  Adjectives and adverbs are compared in Ido by means of the words plu = more, maxim = most, min = less, minim = least, kam = than/as. There exist in Ido three categories of adverbs: the simple, the derived, and the composed. The simple adverbs do not need special endings, for example: tre = very, tro = too, olim = formerly, nun = now, nur = only. The derived and composed adverbs, not being originally adverbs but derived from nouns, adjectives and verbs, have the ending -e.

Syntax
Ido word order is generally the same as English (subject–verb–object), so the sentence Me havas la blua libro is the same as the English "I have the blue book", both in meaning and word order. There are a few differences, however:
 Adjectives can precede the noun as in English, or follow the noun as in Spanish. Thus, Me havas la libro blua means the same thing.
 Ido has the accusative suffix -n. Unlike Esperanto, this suffix is only required when the object of the sentence is not clear, for example, when the subject-verb-object word order is not followed. Thus, La blua libron me havas also means the same thing.

Ido generally does not impose rules of grammatical agreement between grammatical categories within a sentence. For example, the verb in a sentence is invariable regardless of the number and person of the subject. Nor must the adjectives be pluralized as well the nounsin Ido the large books would be la granda libri as opposed to the French les grands livres or the Esperanto la grandaj libroj.

Negation occurs in Ido by simply adding ne before a verb: Me ne havas libro means "I do not have a book". This as well does not vary, and thus the "I do not", "He does not", "They do not" before a verb are simply Me ne, Il ne, and Li ne. In the same way, past tense and future tense negatives are formed by ne before the conjugated verb. "I will not go" and "I did not go" become Me ne iros and Me ne iris respectively.

Yes/no questions are formed by the particle ka in front of the question. "I have a book" (me havas libro) becomes Ka me havas libro? (do I have a book?). Ka can also be placed in front of a noun without a verb to make a simple question, corresponding to the English "is it?" Ka Mark? can mean, "Are you Mark?", "Is it Mark?", "Do you mean Mark?" depending on the context.

Pronouns
The pronouns of Ido were revised to make them more acoustically distinct than those of Esperanto, which all end in i. Especially the singular and plural first-person pronouns mi and ni may be difficult to distinguish in a noisy environment, so Ido has me and ni instead. Ido also distinguishes between intimate (tu) and formal (vu) second-person singular pronouns as well as plural second-person pronouns (vi) not marked for intimacy. Furthermore, Ido has a pan-gender third-person pronoun lu (it can mean "he", "she", or "it", depending on the context) in addition to its masculine (il), feminine (el), and neuter (ol) third-person pronouns.

 ci, although technically the familiar form of the word "you" in Esperanto, is seldom used. Esperanto's inventor himself did not include the pronoun in the first book on Esperanto and only later reluctantly; later he recommended against using ci because different cultures have conflicting traditions regarding the use of the familiar and formal forms of "you".
ri, iŝi, iĝi and by extension iri are proposed neologisms and are rare, but they are still used albeit seldom.

ol, like English it and Esperanto ĝi, is not limited to inanimate objects, but can be used "for entities whose sex is indeterminate: babies, children, humans, youths, elders, people, individuals, horses, [cattle], cats, etc."

Lu is often mistakenly labeled an epicene pronoun, that is, one that refers to both masculine and feminine beings, but in fact, lu is more properly a "pan-gender" pronoun, as it is also used for referring to inanimate objects. From Kompleta Gramatiko Detaloza di la Linguo Internaciona Ido by Beaufront:

Table of correlatives
Ido makes correlatives by combining entire words together and changing the word ending, with some irregularities to show distinction.

 The initial i can be omitted: ta, to, ti, ta.
 One can omit the initial a: ultempe, nultempe, ulspeca, nulspeca, ulmaniere, nulmaniere.
 omnatempe is correct and usable, but sempre is the actual word.
 Instead of irga quanto, nula quanto and la tota quanto one usually says irgo, nulo and omno.

Compound formation

Composition in Ido obeys stricter rules than in Esperanto, especially formation of
nouns, adjectives and verbs from a radical of a different
class.  The reversibility principle assumes that for each composition rule (affix addition), the corresponding decomposition rule (affix removal) is valid.

Hence, while in Esperanto an adjective (for instance , formed on the noun radical , can mean an attribute ( "paper-made encyclopedia") and a relation ( "paper-making factory"), Ido will distinguish  the attribute  ("paper" or "of paper" (not "paper-made" exactly)) from the relation  ("paper-making").

Similarly,  means in both Esperanto and Ido the noun "crown"; where Esperanto allows formation of "to crown" by simply changing the ending from noun to verb  ("crowning" is ), Ido requires an affix so the composition is reversible:  ("the act of crowning" is ).

According to Claude Piron, some modifications brought by Ido are in practice impossible to use and ruin spontaneous expression: Ido displays, on linguistic level, other drawbacks Esperanto succeeded to avoid, but I don't have at hand documents which would allow me to go further in detail.  For instance, if I remember correctly, where Esperanto only has the suffix *, Ido has several: **, **, **, which match subtleties which were meant to make language clearer, but that, in practice, inhibit natural expression.

Vocabulary

Vocabulary in Ido is derived from French, Italian, Spanish, English, German, and Russian. Basing the vocabulary on various widespread languages was intended to make Ido as easy as possible for the greatest number of people possible. Early on, the first 5,371 Ido word roots were analyzed compared to the vocabulary of the six source languages, and the following result was found:

 2024 roots (38%) belong to 6 languages
 942 roots (17%) belong to 5 languages
 1111 roots (21%) belong to 4 languages
 585 roots (11%) belong to 3 languages
 454 roots (8%) belong to 2 languages
 255 roots (5%) belong to 1 language

Another analysis showed that:

 4880 roots (91%) are found in French
 4454 roots (83%) are found in Italian
 4237 roots (79%) are found in Spanish
 4219 roots (79%) are found in English
 3302 roots (61%) are found in German
 2821 roots (52%) are found in Russian

Vocabulary in Ido is often created through a number of official prefixes and suffixes that alter the meaning of the word. This allows a user to take existing words and modify them to create neologisms when necessary, and allows for a wide range of expression without the need to learn new vocabulary each time. Though their number is too large to be included in one article, some examples include:
The diminutive suffix -et-. Domo (house) becomes dometo (cottage), and libro (book) becomes libreto (novelette or short story).
The pejorative suffix -ach-. Domo becomes domacho (hovel), and libro becomes libracho (a shoddy piece of work, pulp fiction, etc.)
The prefix retro-, which implies a reversal. Irar (to go) becomes retroirar (to go back, backward) and venar (to come) becomes retrovenar (to return).

New vocabulary is generally created through an analysis of the word, its etymology, and reference to the six source languages. If a word can be created through vocabulary already existing in the language then it will usually be adopted without need for a new radical (such as wikipedio for Wikipedia, which consists of wiki + enciklopedio for encyclopedia), and if not an entirely new word will be created. The word alternatoro for example was adopted in 1926, likely because five of the six source languages used largely the same orthography for the word, and because it was long enough to avoid being mistaken for other words in the existing vocabulary. Adoption of a word is done through consensus, after which the word will be made official by the union. Care must also be taken to avoid homonyms if possible, and usually a new word undergoes some discussion before being adopted. Foreign words that have a restricted sense and are not likely to be used in everyday life (such as the word intifada to refer to the conflict between Israel and Palestine) are left untouched, and often written in italics.

Ido, unlike Esperanto, does not assume the male sex by default. For example, Ido does not derive the word for "waitress" by adding a feminine suffix to "waiter", as Esperanto does.

Sample

The Lord's Prayer:

Literature and publications
Ido has a number of publications that can be subscribed to or downloaded for free in most cases.  is a magazine produced in France every few months with a range of topics.  is a magazine produced by the Spanish Ido Society every two months that has a range of topics, as well as a few dozen pages of work translated from other languages.  is the official organ of the Ido movement and has been around since the inception of the movement in 1908. Other sites can be found with various stories, fables or proverbs along with a few books of the Bible translated into Ido on a smaller scale. The site  has a few podcasts in Ido along with various songs and other recorded material.

Wikipedia includes an Ido-language edition (known in Ido as ); in January 2012 it was the 81st most visited Wikipedia.

Symbols of Ido

The Ido star or Jankó star is the main symbol of Ido. It is a six pointed star, with the points representing Ido's six source languages: English, French, Italian, German, Spanish and Russian. Alternatively, the six points represent the six continents (excluding Antarctica). The emblem was originally a six pointed white star on a circular blue background, consisting of two concentric, equilateral triangles, with one vertically flipped. However, this was soon changed due to the similarity it presented with the Star of David, since a true international auxiliary language should not have religious affiliations.

After a search to find an appropriate new symbol, the Ido-Akademio decided on the current Ido symbol, created by their secretary, Paul von Jankó (hence the alternative name the Jankó star). The current Ido Star is a concave isotoxal hexagon, with a vertically flipped equilateral triangle overlaid on top. This new shape also had the benefit of being able to be copyrighted.

International Ido conventions
ULI organises Ido conventions yearly, and the conventions include a mix of tourism and work.

 2019: Berlin, Germany, 15 participants from 2 countries (Information)
 2018: Provins, France, 11 participants from 5 countries (Information)
 2017: České Budějovice, Czech Republic, 8 participants from 5 countries (Information)
 2016: Valencia, Spain, 10 participants from 7 countries (Information)
 2015: Berlin, Germany, 14 participants (Information)
 2014: Paris, France (Information)
 2013: Ouroux-en-Morvan, France, 13 participants from 4 countries (Information)
 2012: Dessau, Germany, 12 participants (Information)
 2011: Echternach, Luxembourg (Information), 24 participants from 11 countries
 2010: Tübingen, Germany (Information)
 2009: Riga, Latvia, and Tallinn, Estonia, 14 participants from 7 countries (Information)
 2008: Wuppertal-Neviges, Germany, 18 participants from 5 countries (Information)
 2007: Paris, France, 14 participants from 9 countries (Information,  Photos)
 2006: Berlin, Germany, approx. 25 participants from 10 countries (Information)
 2005: Toulouse, France, 13 participants from 4 countries (Information)
 2004: Kyiv, Ukraine, 17 participants from 9 countries (Information)
 2003: Großbothen, Germany, participants from 6 countries (Information)
 2002: Kraków, Poland, 14 participants from 6 countries (Information)
 2001: Nuremberg, Germany, 14 participants from 5 countries (Information)
 2000: Nuremberg, Germany
 1999: Waldkappel, Germany
 1998: Białobrzegi, Poland, 15 participants from 6 countries
 1997: Bakkum, Netherlands, 19 participants from 7 countries
 1995: Elsnigk, Germany
 1991: Ostend, Belgium, 21 participants
 1990: Waldkappel, Germany
 1989: Zürich-Thalwil, Switzerland
 1987: Eschwege, Germany
 1985: Antwerp, Belgium
 1983: York, England
 1981: Jongny, Switzerland
 1980: Namur, Belgium, 35 participants
 1979: Uppsala, Sweden
 1978: Cambridge, England
 1977: Berlin-Tegel, Germany
 1976: Saint-Nazaire, France
 1975: Thun, Switzerland
 1974: Kyiv, Ukraine
 1973: Cardiff, Wales
 1972: Chaux-de-Fonds, Switzerland
 1971: Trollhättan, Sweden
 1970: Luxembourg City, Luxembourg
 1969: Zürich, Switzerland
 1968: Berlin, Germany
 1967: Bourges, France
 1966: Biella, Italy
 1965: Lons-le-Saunier, France
 1964: Kiel, Germany
 1963: Barcelona, Spain
 1962: Thun, Switzerland
 1961: Zürich, Switzerland,  participants
 1960: Colmar, France
 1959: Freiburg im Breisgau, Germany
 1957: Luxembourg City, Luxembourg
 1952: Berlin, Germany
 1951: Turin, Italy
 1950: Colmar, France
 1939: St. Gallen, Switzerland
 1937: Paris, France
 1936: Szombathely, Hungary
 1935: Fredericia, Denmark
 1934: Oostduinkerke, Belgium
 1933: Mondorf, Luxembourg
 1931: Lauenburg/Elbe, Germany
 1930: Sopron, Hungary
 1929: Freiburg im Breisgau, Germany
 1928: Zürich, Switzerland
 1927: Paris, France
 1926: Prague, Czechoslovakia
 1925: Turin, Italy
 1924: Luxembourg City, Luxembourg
 1923: Kassel, Germany
 1922: Dessau, Germany
 1921: Vienna, Austria

See also

 Comparison between Esperanto and Ido
 Comparison between Ido and Novial
 Comparison between Ido and Interlingua
 Interhelpo
 English false friends in Ido
 Engelbert Pigal

References

Additional notes
 L. Couturat, L. Leau. Delegation pour l'adoption d'une Langue auxiliare internationale (15–24 October 1907). Coulommiers: Imprimerie Paul Brodard, 1907

External links

 The international language Ido
 Union for the International Language Ido (in Ido)
 Ido : a Modern Language
 The IDO foundation for language research in memory of Hellmut Röhnish
 Otto Jespersen's history of Ido
 Henry Jacob's history of Ido
 Ido for all – English course for learning Ido
 Online Ido library (in Ido)
 Examples of Ido Phrases

Esperantido
 
Constructed languages
International auxiliary languages
Constructed languages introduced in the 1900s
International auxiliary languages introduced in the 1900s